Noctueliopsis brunnealis is a moth in the family Crambidae. It was described by Eugene G. Munroe in 1972. It is found in North America, where it has been recorded from Arizona, California, Nevada, New Mexico and Texas.

Adults have been recorded on wing from March to May and from July to September.

References

Moths described in 1972
Odontiini